Anginon is a genus of flowering plant in the family Apiaceae. It is endemic to southern Africa.

Species 
, Plants of the World Online accepted the following species:
Anginon difforme (L.) B.L.Burtt
Anginon fruticosum I.Allison & B.-E.van Wyk
Anginon intermedium I.Allison & B.-E.van Wyk
Anginon jaarsveldii B.L.Burtt
Anginon paniculatum (Thunb.) B.L.Burtt
Anginon pumilum I.Allison & B.-E.van Wyk
Anginon rugosum (Thunb.) Raf.
Anginon streyi (Merxm.) I.Allison & B.-E.van Wyk
Anginon swellendamense (Eckl. & Zeyh.) B.L.Burtt
Anginon tenuius I.Allison & B.-E.van Wyk
Anginon ternatum I.Allison & B.-E.van Wyk
Anginon verticillatum (Sond.) B.L.Burtt

References 

 
Apioideae genera
Taxa named by Constantine Samuel Rafinesque